Eppingen station is the station of Eppingen in the German state of Baden-Württemberg. It is a junction station, where the so-called Kraichgau-Stromberg-Bahn ("Kraichgau-Stromberg railway", referring to two nearby regions), the Steinsfurt–Eppingen railway branches from the Kraichgau Railway (Kraichgaubahn, Heilbronn Eppingen–Karlsruhe railway). It is served by services on S4 line of the Karlsruhe Stadtbahn and the Heilbronn Stadtbahn on the one hand and services on the line S5 of the Rhine-Neckar S-Bahn on the other hand.

Entrance building

The entrance building was built in 1879 according to plans of the Karlsruhe architect Ludwig Diemer in the Italian Renaissance Revival style. The building has belonged since 1 January 2013 to the town of Eppingen and is under heritage protection. It is being restored faithfully for the 2021 State Garden Show (Landesgartenschau), which is to be held in Eppingen. The station has been substantially restored  since September 2013.

Notes

References

External links 

Railway stations in Baden-Württemberg
Railway stations in Germany opened in 1879
Rhine-Neckar S-Bahn stations
Karlsruhe Stadtbahn stations
Buildings and structures in Heilbronn (district)
Eppingen